ULJK Group is a Financial Institution Company, located at Bombay Stock Exchange (BSE), Dalal Street, Kala Ghoda, Mumbai (formerly Bombay), Maharashtra, India. The company was established in the year 1903. The group name ULJK stands for the four generations who contributed in creating and developing the organization – Umesh Vora, Laldas Vora, Jamnadas Vora and Khushaldas Vora.

History 

Based out of the Bombay Stock Exchange towers, ULJK GROUP has 113 years old history with respect to providing financial services and advisory. The company was established in the year 1903. Laldas Vora, late partner was the President of Bombay Stock Exchange for 9 years and had contributed in overseeing the construction of the Bombay Stock Exchange Tower. ULJK Group is now in its 5th family generation of serving the financial services community.

Corporate overview

Subsidiaries 

ULJK Group has a number of subsidiaries. These are listed below: 
 ULJK Securities Pvt. Ltd. (BSE & Category I Merchant Banker)
 ULJK Financial Services Pvt Ltd (NSE)
 ULJK Commodities Pvt. Ltd. (MCX)

Headquarters 

ULJK's headquarters is located in Stock Exchange Towers (Bombay Stock Exchange), Dalal Street, Fort, Mumbai.

Board of directors 

As of January 2017, the board of directors have the following members:
 Madhavi Umesh Vora – Chairperson

Products and services 

 Institutional Trading
 Real Estate Advisory
 Institutional Research
 Investment Banking
 Portfolio Management
 Mutual Funds
 Derivatives
 Arbitrage

References

External links

Financial services companies based in Mumbai
Financial services companies established in 1903
Indian companies established in 1903